Lynn Anderson (1947–2015) was an American country music artist and equestrian.

Lynn Anderson may refer to her eponymous albums, such as:
 Lynn Anderson (album), 1971 compilation

Similar variations, such as Lin Anderson or Lynne Anderson, may refer to:

 Lynn Anderson, maiden name of Da Yoopers keyboardist Lynn Bellmore
 Lin Anderson, a Scottish novelist and screenwriter.
 Lynne Anderson, an Australian sports administrator.